Tanjung Priuk Station (TPK), is a railway station in Tanjung Priok, Tanjung Priok, North Jakarta. It is located across the Tanjung Priok Port, which is the main port of Jakarta. This station is one of the oldest in Jakarta and the biggest station built during the Dutch East Indies era. It is included in the list of heritage buildings by the government of Jakarta.

History
The history of Tanjung Priuk station is intertwined with the port of Tanjung Priok, the main port and gateway to Batavia and thereby of the entire Dutch East Indies.

First generation 

In the past, Tanjung Priok was a dangerous forest and swamp, so a safe means of transportation was needed at that time (railway). At the end of the 19th century, the Sunda Kelapa port which was originally located in the area around the Fish Market was no longer sufficient, and the Dutch built a new port facility at Tanjung Priok. The port was built in 1877 in response to the increased maritime traffic accompanying the opening of the Suez Canal. Since Tanjung Priok is situated further away from Batavia than the old port of Sunda Kelapa, a railway was constructed linking Tanjung Priok to the city of Batavia in the southwest. This would provide a safe and comfortable means of transportation in the swampy area.

The first Tanjung Priuk Station is located near the pier of Tanjung Priok Port. This station was completed by Burgerlijke Openbare Werken in 1883 and it was only on November 2, 1885 that its opening was inaugurated at the same time as the opening of Tanjung Priok Port. The first station opened to the quay immediately next to the first harbour. 

Furthermore, the operation of the Sunda Kelapa-Tanjung Priuk railway line was handed over to Staatsspoorwegen (SS).  Until 1900, no less than 40 train trips per day for the Tanjung Priuk–Batavia SS/NIS pp and Tanjung Priuk–Kemayoran pp routes.

Second generation 

With the increase of the port activity since the early 20th century, there has been an expansion of the port which caused the Tanjung Priuk Station to be evicted. SS then looked for vacant land next to the Lagoa warehouse to build a new station. SS assigned Engineer C.W. Koch as the main architect of the station.

To prepare for the construction of the station, SS made a mock-up model of the new Tanjung Priuk Station. This mockup appears in the book commemorating the 50th anniversary of the SS by S.A. Reitsma. SS then contracted a steel company named Machinefabriek Braat Soerabaia-Djokja-Tegal located in Ngagel, Surabaya to manufacture its overcapping roof frame. At that time, the ruling Governor General was A.F.W. Idenburg (1909-1916). It takes about 1,700 workers with 130 of them being European workers.

This new station was opened to the public on April 6, 1925 which coincided with the launch of the first KRL route from Tanjung Priok to Meester Cornelis (Jatinegara). The first launch was also carried out to commemorate the 50th anniversary of the SS. The station building is in the Art Deco style and has an area of 3,678 m2 (0.3678 ha), standing on an embankment area which covers 46,930 m2 (4.693 ha).

With the completion of this station, the "wasting act" was committed by the SS. With eight lines and five platforms, this station is very large and since 1929 this station is almost as big as the Batavia-benedenstad station which has now turned into Jakarta Kota Station. Unfortunately, ships that dock at Tanjung Priok Harbor do not bring passengers to this station. This station later only became the terminus for KRL since 1925.

This station is also equipped with temporary accommodation on the left wing of the building for passengers who will continue their journey by ship. With the opening of Kemayoran Airport which serves general flights, SS experienced a tough challenge considering that many passengers switched to airplanes. The location of Tanjung Priuk Station which is far from the port makes passengers reluctant to use the train, even though feeder buses are available. World War II had a significant impact on SS railroad operations. During the Japanese occupation of Indonesia, this station was prioritized for war purposes and sent romusha out of Java.

Present day 

In the early 1990s, the Ministry of Transportation had planned to build a Jakarta outer ring rail network that would connect this station with Cikarang Station via Pasoso Station, but was diverted to Sungai Lagoa Station. One of the goals is to minimize freight trains crossing urban areas in Jakarta. At first the plan went quite well with the completion of the Citayam to Nambo railway network, but the 1997 Asian financial crisis made this plan stop halfway.

Amidst the hustle and bustle of the port, the condition of the station building became increasingly unkempt towards the 21st century.  Nonetheless, the elegance of this neoclassical, art deco and contemporary building has proven that in the 20th century, this station triumphed in its time. Indeed, at that time PT Kereta Api had deactivated the station for passenger service in early January 2000. The roof of the building is off;  many of the glass is broken and many of the framework is rusty with age. The station platform and its emplacements are full of homeless people. In order to "patch up" the leaking revenue due to stowaways and losses due to the lack of revenue from platform tickets, PT Kereta Api leased out its station space as a warehouse for expeditions, ticket agents, and money exchange services.

Concerned about this condition, PT Kereta Api decided to completely renovate the station. Preparations were carried out in November-December 2008 by carrying out a major physical renovation of the station building. Furthermore, the project continued with the rehabilitation of rail facilities and the construction of electrical signaling devices in early 2009. On April 28, 2009, this station was able to return to function and was inaugurated by President Susilo Bambang Yudhoyono, along with the inauguration of Terminal 3 of the Soekarno–Hatta International Airport.

Building and layout 

This station has eight train lines with line 2 as a straight line to Jakarta Kota, line 3 as a straight line from Jakarta Kota, line 6 as a straight line to Rajawali-Pasar Senen-Jatinegara, and line 7 as a straight line from Jatinegara-Pasar Senen-Rajawali. On the northwestern wing of the station emplacement there is a fork in the path to the port.

Even though this station is not a central station, it is quite modern because it uses an arc-shaped overcapping framework that covers the six railway lines. Steel structures became common on European stations in the 20th century.  Windows in the form of lines consisting of horizontal roof profile trim and cornice holes, vertical lines and wall indentations, giving a graceful impression. Stained glass and ceramic profile ornaments give a grandiose effect and are strengthened by large and strong columns on the main porch and supported by stairs along the building.

Notes:
 Currently, Line 1 and 2 serves KRL Commuterline Tanjung Priok Line.
 Currently, Line 1, 3, 4, 5, and 6 are only used for flat train car parking (filled or empty).

Services 
So far only a few long distance economy class trains depart/terminate at this station. Starting from 1 November 2014, Tanjung Priuk Station only serves freight trains heading from/to Tanjung Priok Port. All passenger trains that used to terminate here were rerouted to Pasar Senen.

On 21 December 2015, the pink line to Jakarta Kota railway station was reopened, after being inactive for years.

Passenger train

Commuterline

Freight train 

 Container transportation: Swing point towards  or towards JICT Tanjung Priok Port:
 from and towards 
 from and towards Surabaya Container Terminal
 from and towards  via 
 from and towards  via 
 from and towards 
 from and towards 
 from and towards

Supporting transportation

In popular culture 
Tanjung Priuk Station is often used as a shooting location for music videos, movies, soap operas, and commercials. Several titles of soap operas and songs whose music videos have used filming locations at this station include Dia Bukan Anakku (RCTI, SinemArt), "Menunggumu" sung by Chrisye featuring Peterpan (now named Noah), "Ku Tetap Menanti" created by Eka Gustiwana sung by Nikita Willy, and "Dengan Nafasmu" by Ungu.

Photography prohibition 
Since the commercialization of Tanjung Priuk Station through commercials, television shows, and music videos filming, this station is now a very strict place for novice and experienced photographers because this place is prohibited as a photographing area, even though there are absolutely no signs prohibiting taking pictures.  at Station. The reason for the cultural heritage status of this station is "never implemented" at other sites managed by the local government or BPCB. Taking an SLR camera (including DSLR and mirrorless) or pocket digital camera on several occasions can be warned by security officers. Since the enactment of the new photographing rules at Commuter Line KRL stations, only cell phone cameras, pocket cameras, SLRs and action cameras (GoPro) are allowed to be used to photograph stations.

References

Cited works

External links

North Jakarta
Railway stations in Jakarta
Railway stations opened in 1885
Colonial architecture in Jakarta
Art Deco railway stations